This is a list of Spanish football transfers for the summer sale in the 2017–18 season of La Liga and Segunda División. Only moves from La Liga and Segunda División are listed.

The summer transfer window began on 1 July 2017, although a few transfers took place prior to that date. The window closed at midnight on 1 September 2017. Players without a club can join one at any time, either during or in between transfer windows. Clubs below La Liga level can also sign players on loan at any time. If needed, clubs can sign a goalkeeper on an emergency loan, if all others are unavailable. Unless noted, all of the clubs without a flag are from Spain.

La Liga

Alavés 
Manager:  Luis Zubeldía (1st season)

In

Out

Athletic Bilbao 
Manager:  José Ángel Ziganda (1st season)

In

Out

Atlético Madrid 
Manager:  Diego Simeone (7th season)

In

Out

Barcelona 
Manager:  Ernesto Valverde (1st season)

In

Out

Celta de Vigo 
Manager:  Juan Carlos Unzué (1st season)

In

Out

Deportivo La Coruña 
Manager:  Pepe Mel (2nd season)

In

Out

Eibar 
Manager:  José Luis Mendilibar (3rd season)

In

Out

Espanyol 
Manager:  Quique Sánchez Flores (2nd season)

In

Out

Getafe 
Manager:  José Bordalás (2nd season)

In

Out

Girona 
Manager:  Pablo Machín (5th season)

In

Out

Las Palmas 
Manager:  Manolo Márquez (1st season)

In

Out

Leganés 
Manager:  Asier Garitano (5th season)

In

Out

Levante 
Manager:  Juan Muñiz (2nd season)

In

Out

Málaga 
Manager:  Míchel (2nd season)

In

Out

Real Betis 
Manager:  Quique Setién (1st season)

In

Out

Real Madrid 
Manager:  Zinedine Zidane (3rd season)

In

Out

Real Sociedad 
Manager:  Eusebio Sacristán (3rd season)

In

Out

Sevilla 
Manager:  Eduardo Berizzo (1st season)

In

Out

Valencia 
Manager:  Marcelino (1st season)

In

Out

Villarreal 
Manager:  Fran Escribá (2nd season)

In

Out

Segunda División

Albacete 
Manager:  José Manuel Aira (2nd season)

In

Out

Alcorcón 
Manager:  Julio Velázquez (2nd season)

In

Out

Almería 
Manager:  Luis Miguel Ramis (2nd season)

In

Out

Barcelona B 
Manager:  Gerard López (3rd season)

In

Out

Cádiz 
Manager:  Álvaro Cervera (3rd season)

In

Out

Córdoba 
Manager:  Luis Carrión (2nd season)

In

Out

Cultural Leonesa 
Manager:  Rubén de la Barrera (2nd season)

In

Out

Gimnàstic 
Manager:  Lluís Carreras (1st season)

In

Out

Granada 
Manager:  José Luis Oltra (1st season)

In

Out

Huesca 
Manager:  Rubi (1st season)

In

Out

Lorca FC 
Manager:  Curro Torres (1st season)

In

Out

Lugo 
Manager:  Francisco (1st season)

In

Out

Numancia 
Manager:  Jagoba Arrasate (3rd season)

In

Out

Osasuna 
Manager:  Diego Martínez (1st season)

In

Out

Oviedo 
Manager:  Juan Antonio Anquela (1st season)

In

Out

Rayo Vallecano 
Manager:  Míchel (2nd season)

In

Out

Reus 
Manager:  Aritz López Garai (1st season)

In

Out

Sevilla Atlético 
Manager:  Luis Tevenet (1st season)

In

Out

Sporting Gijón 
Manager:  Paco Herrera (1st season)

In

Out

Tenerife 
Manager:  José Luis Martí (3rd season)

In

Out

Valladolid 
Manager:  Luis César Sampedro (1st season)

In

Out

Zaragoza 
Manager:  Natxo González (1st season)

In

Out

References

Transfers
Spain
2017